Jorgelina Cravero (born 23 January 1982) is a retired Argentine tennis player.

She has career-high WTA rankings of 106 in singles (achieved on 10 September 2007) and 114 in doubles (set on 17 November 2008). Cravero has not won a title on the WTA Tour in singles or doubles. However, she won 15 singles titles and 34 doubles titles on the ITF Circuit.

In 2007, Cravero qualified for three of the four Grand Slam tournaments, losing in the opening round every time: to Justine Henin at Wimbledon, to Martina Müller at the Australian Open and to Aravane Rezaï at the US Open.

Playing for Argentina Fed Cup team, Cravero has a win–loss record of 6–7.

Most memorable experiences were qualifying for the Australian Open and Wimbledon in 2007. Cravero enjoys the clay surface best of all and started playing tennis at the age of five. She turned professional in 2000.

In 2011, she announced her retirement from professional tennis.

Personal
Cravero was born in San Francisco, Córdoba. The right-hander lives in Buenos Aires. Her father Carlos is an accountant; mother Rita is a math teacher; she has one brother, Eugenio, and three sisters, Monica, Daniela and Maria Alejandra.

ITF Circuit finals

Singles: 23 (15 titles, 8 runner-ups)

Doubles: 54 (34 titles, 20 runner-ups)

References

External links
 
 
 

1982 births
Living people
Argentine female tennis players
Pan American Games gold medalists for Argentina
People from San Francisco, Córdoba
Tennis players at the 2007 Pan American Games
Pan American Games medalists in tennis
Competitors at the 1998 South American Games
South American Games bronze medalists for Argentina
South American Games medalists in tennis
Tennis players at the 2003 Pan American Games
Medalists at the 2007 Pan American Games
Sportspeople from Córdoba Province, Argentina
21st-century Argentine women